Laura Lee can refer to:
 Laura Lee (singer-songwriter) (born 1945), American soul and gospel singer-songwriter
 Laura Lee (sex worker) (1973–2018), Irish-born sex worker and activist based in the UK
 Laura Lee (bassist) (born 1986), Mexican-American bassist and singer-songwriter (Khruangbin)
 Laura Lee (YouTuber) (born 1988), American make-up artist, YouTuber, beauty blogger, and beauty influencer

See also
Laura-Lee Smith (born 1978), New Zealand table tennis player
Lauralee, given name
Division of Laura Lee, Swedish musical collective